The 1958–59 SK Rapid Wien season was the 61st season in club history.

Squad

Squad and statistics

Squad statistics

Fixtures and results

League

Cup

References

1958-59 Rapid Wien Season
Rapid